Thales Academy is a network of private non-sectarian community schools located primarily in central North Carolina. The school was founded in 2007 by Robert L. Luddy and graduated its first senior class in 2016 with three seniors. As of 2021, there are over 3600+ students stretched across 12 campuses mainly based in North Carolina, but also a campus located in Virginia and Tennessee.
The Pre-K–12 college preparatory school was named for the Greek philosopher Thales of Miletus, often credited as the father of Greek Philosophy.

History 

Thales Academy, a 501(c)(3) not-for-profit school, was established in 2007 by Robert L. Luddy, a North Carolina entrepreneur, educator, philanthropist, and founder of CaptiveAire Systems. Prior to Thales, Luddy founded Franklin Academy in Wake Forest, one of the state’s largest charter schools, and St. Thomas More Academy in Raleigh, an independent Catholic college preparatory school. Luddy founded Thales in an effort to create a model school to offer a higher quality education than local schools at a more affordable cost.

Since its founding, Thales Academy has opened eight locations, with more in development.

Locations 

Current locations for Thales Academy are Rolesville, Holly Springs, Knightdale, Raleigh, Apex, Wake Forest, and Waxhaw, North Carolina, with developing campuses in Cary, and Pittsboro. The newly constructed, two-story brick buildings consist of approximately 20 classrooms on 34,000 square feet (grades K–5 campuses) or 55,000 square feet (grades 6–12 campuses). The buildings feature Greek columns, polished concrete floors, large windows, and painted classical murals in hallways in an effort to instill “the importance of order and beauty.” K–5 campuses offer playgrounds with artificial turf. Junior high and high school campuses offer full-sized gymnasiums and auditoriums as well as outdoor soccer fields.

Education methods 

Thales Academy uses a classical education method to educate its students. In grades K–5, the school uses a methodology known as Direct Instruction (DI). DI uses repetition and frequent assessment to verify student achievement before moving to the next lesson. Lessons are fast-paced with choral responses to maintain student engagement. In grades 6–12, DI is phased out as students begin to use the Socratic Method through education in the trivium. Classes are grouped by student ability, allowing for larger class sizes. As a college-preparatory school, Thales Academy offers a STEM-focused elective track called the “Luddy Institute of Technology,” which teaches pre-engineering classes for high school students.

References

External links 

Private schools in North Carolina